Marshal of the Royal Air Force Sir Arthur Travers Harris, 1st Baronet,  (13 April 1892 – 5 April 1984), commonly known as "Bomber" Harris by the press and often within the RAF as "Butch" Harris, was Air Officer Commanding-in-Chief (AOC-in-C) RAF Bomber Command during the height of the Anglo-American strategic bombing campaign against Nazi Germany in the Second World War.

Born in Gloucestershire, Harris emigrated to Rhodesia in 1910, aged 17. He joined the 1st Rhodesia Regiment at the outbreak of the First World War and saw action in South Africa and South West Africa. In 1915, Harris returned to England to fight in the European theatre of the war. He joined the Royal Flying Corps, with which he remained until the formation of the Royal Air Force in 1918. Harris remained in the Air Force through the 1920s and 1930s, serving in India, Mesopotamia, Persia, Egypt, Palestine, and elsewhere.

At the outbreak of the Second World War in 1939, Harris took command of No. 5 Group RAF in England, and in February 1942 was appointed head of Bomber Command. He retained that position for the rest of the war. In the same year, the British Cabinet agreed to the "area bombing" of German cities. Harris was given the task of implementing Churchill's policy and supported the development of tactics and technology to perform the task more effectively. Harris assisted British Chief of the Air Staff Marshal of the Royal Air Force Charles Portal in carrying out the United Kingdom's most devastating attacks against the German infrastructure and population, including the Bombing of Dresden. After the war Harris moved to South Africa, where he managed the South African Marine Corporation. He was created a baronet in 1953.

Harris's continued preference for area bombing over precision targeting remains controversial, partly because many senior Allied air commanders thought it less effective and partly for the large number of civilian casualties and destruction the strategy caused in Continental Europe.

Early life
Harris was born on 13 April 1892, at Cheltenham, Gloucestershire, where his parents were staying while his father George Steel Travers Harris was on home leave from the Indian Civil Service. With his father in India most of the time, Harris grew up without a sense of solid roots and belonging; he spent much of his later childhood with the family of a Kent rector, the Reverend C E Graham-Jones, whom he later recalled fondly. Harris was educated at Allhallows School in Devon, while his two elder brothers were educated at the more prestigious Sherborne and Eton, respectively; according to biographer Henry Probert, this was because Sherborne and Eton were expensive and "there was not much money left for number three".

A former Allhallows student, the actor Arthur Chudleigh, often visited the school and gave the boys free tickets to his shows. Harris received such a ticket in 1909, and went to see the play during his summer holidays. The lead character in the show was a Rhodesian farmer who returned to England to marry, but ultimately fell out with his pompous fiancée and married the more practical housemaid instead. The idea of a country where one was judged on ability rather than class was very inspiring to the adventurous Harris, who promptly told his father (who had just retired and returned to England) that he intended to emigrate to Southern Rhodesia instead of going back to Allhallows for the new term. Harris's father was disappointed, having had in mind a military or civil service career for his son, but reluctantly agreed.

In early 1910, Harris senior paid his son's passage on the SS Inanda to Beira in Mozambique, from where he travelled by rail to Umtali in Manicaland. Harris earned his living over the next few years mining, coach-driving and farming. He received a more permanent position in November 1913, when he was taken on by Crofton Townsend, a man from near Cork in Ireland who had moved to Rhodesia and founded Lowdale Farm near Mazoe in Mashonaland in 1903. Harris quickly gained his employer's trust, and was made farm manager at Lowdale when Townsend went to visit England for a year in early 1914. Having acquired the skills necessary to ranch successfully in Rhodesia, Harris decided that he would start his own farm in the country as soon as Townsend returned. According to Probert, Harris by now regarded himself "primarily as a Rhodesian", a self-identification he retained for the rest of his life.

Military career

First World War

When the First World War broke out in August 1914, Harris did not learn of it for nearly a month, being out in the bush at the time. Despite his previous reluctance to follow the path his father had had in mind for him in the army, and his desire to set up his own ranch in Rhodesia, Harris felt patriotically compelled to join the war effort. He quickly attempted to join the 1st Rhodesia Regiment, which had been raised by the British South Africa Company administration to help put down the Maritz Rebellion in South Africa, but he found that only two positions were available: as a machine-gunner or as a bugler. Having learnt to bugle at Allhallows, he successfully applied to be a bugler and was sworn in on 20 October 1914.

The 1st Rhodesia Regiment briefly garrisoned Bloemfontein, then served alongside the South African forces in South-West Africa during the first half of 1915. The campaign made a strong impression on Harris, particularly the long desert marches; three decades later, he wrote that "to this day I never walk a step if I can get any sort of vehicle to carry me". South-West Africa also provided Harris with his first experience of aerial bombing: the sole German aircraft in South-West Africa attempted to drop artillery shells on his unit, but failed to do any damage.

When the South-West African Campaign ended in July 1915, the 1st Rhodesia Regiment was withdrawn to Cape Town, where it was disbanded; Harris was formally discharged on 31 July. He felt initially that he had done his part for the Empire, and went back to Rhodesia to resume work at Lowdale, but he and many of his former comrades soon reconsidered when it became clear that the war in Europe was going to last much longer than they had expected. They were reluctant to join the 2nd Rhodesia Regiment, which was being raised to serve in East Africa, perceiving the "bush whacking" of the war's African theatre as less important than the "real war" in Europe. Harris sailed for England from Beira at the Company administration's expense in August, a member of a 300-man party of white Southern Rhodesian war volunteers. He arrived in October 1915, moved in with his parents in London and, after unsuccessfully attempting to find a position in first the cavalry, then the Royal Artillery, joined the Royal Flying Corps as a second lieutenant on probation on 6 November 1915.

Harris learned to fly at Brooklands in late 1915 and, having been confirmed in his rank and then promoted to flying officer on 29 January 1916, he then served with distinction on the home front and in France during 1917 as a flight commander and ultimately CO of No. 45 Squadron, flying the Sopwith 1½ Strutter and Sopwith Camel. Before he returned to Britain to command No. 44 Squadron on Home Defence duties, Harris claimed five enemy aircraft destroyed and was awarded the Air Force Cross (AFC) on 2 November 1918. Intending to return to Rhodesia one day, Harris wore a "" shoulder flash on his uniform. He finished the war a major.

Inter-war years
Harris remained in the newly formed Royal Air Force (RAF) following the end of the First World War, choosing an air force career over a return to Rhodesia because he and his first wife Barbara had just had their first child, and he did not think Barbara would enjoy being a Rhodesian farmer's wife. In April 1920 Squadron Leader Harris was jointly appointed station commander of RAF Digby and commander of No. 3 Flying Training School RAF. He later served in different capacities in India, Mesopotamia and Persia. He said of his service in India that he first became involved in bombing during the usual annual North West Frontier tribesmen trouble. His squadron was equipped with poorly-maintained Bristol F.2 Fighter aircraft. In Mesopotamia he commanded a Vickers Vernon squadron. Harris later wrote of his time there that "We cut a hole in the nose and rigged up our own bomb racks and I turned those machines into the heaviest and best bombers in the command." Harris also contributed to the development of bombing techniques by promoting the deployment of delay-action bombs, which were subsequently utilised by RAF Iraq Command during their suppression of various Middle Eastern revolts (such as the Iraqi revolt of 1920, the Adwan Rebellion, the Ahmed Barzani revolt and the Mahmud Barzanji revolts). Harris once remarked that "the only thing the Arab understands is the heavy hand."

During the 1920s Harris occasionally doubted his decision to remain with the RAF rather than going back to Rhodesia; he submitted his resignation in May 1922, but was persuaded to stay. He helped devise area bombing in Iraq in 1923. One year later he was posted to the UK to command the first postwar heavy bomber squadron (No. 58). His commander in Iraq had been the future Chief of the Air Staff Sir John Salmond, who was also one of his commanders back in Britain. Together they developed "night training for night operations". He was appointed an Officer of the Order of the British Empire on 3 June 1927 and promoted to wing commander on 1 July 1927.

From 1927 to 1929, Harris attended the Army Staff College at Camberley, where he discovered that at the college the Army kept 200 horses for the officers' fox hunting. At a time when all services were very short of equipment, the Army high command—which was still dominated by cavalry officers—clearly had a different set of priorities from technocrats like Harris, who quipped that the army commanders would only be happy with the tank if someone developed one that "ate hay and thereafter made noises like a horse". He also had a low opinion of the Navy; he commented that there were three things which should never be allowed on a well-run yacht, "a wheelbarrow, an umbrella and a naval officer". Bernard Montgomery was one of the few army officers he met while at the college whom he liked, possibly because they shared certain underlying personality characteristics.

His next command was of a flying-boat squadron, where he continued to develop night flying techniques. He was promoted to group captain on 30 June 1933. From 1934 to 1937 he was the Deputy Director of Plans in the Air Ministry. He was posted to the Middle East Command in Egypt, as a senior Air Staff Officer. In 1936 Harris commented on the Palestinian Arab revolt that "one 250 lb. or 500 lb. bomb in each village that speaks out of turn" would satisfactorily solve the problem. The same year he visited Southern Rhodesia in a professional capacity to help the Southern Rhodesian government set up its own air force.

On 2 July 1937 Harris was promoted to air commodore and in 1938 he was put in command of No. 4 (Bomber) Group. After a purchasing mission to the United States he was posted to Palestine and Trans-Jordan, where he became Officer Commanding the RAF contingent in that area with promotion to air vice-marshal on 1 July 1939.

In this period Harris, and others, pressured senior staff for large strategic bombers, which could bomb German targets from England. This resulted in specifications from the Air Staff which led to the Avro Manchester, Handley Page Halifax and Short Stirling. Later, after severe shortcomings were displayed on operations, the Manchester was redesigned to become the very effective Avro Lancaster.

Second World War

Harris returned to Britain in September 1939 to take command of No. 5 Group. Appointed a Companion of the Order of the Bath on 11 July 1940 he was made Deputy Chief of the Air Staff in November 1940 and promoted to the acting rank of air marshal on 1 June 1941.

The Butt Report, circulated in August 1941, found that in 1940 and 1941 only one in three attacking aircraft got within five miles (eight kilometres) of their target. As part of the response Harris was appointed Commander-in-Chief (C-in-C) of Bomber Command in February 1942. He was advanced to Knight Commander of the Order of the Bath on 11 June 1942.

In 1942, Professor Frederick Lindemann (later ennobled as Lord Cherwell), having been appointed the British government's leading scientific adviser (with a seat in the Cabinet) by his friend, Prime Minister Winston Churchill, presented a seminal paper to Cabinet advocating the area bombing of German cities in a strategic bombing campaign. It was accepted by Cabinet and Harris was directed to carry out the task (Area bombing directive). It became an important part of the total war waged against Germany.

At the start of the bombing campaign, Harris said, quoting  from the Old Testament, "The Nazis entered this war under the rather childish delusion that they were going to bomb everyone else, and nobody was going to bomb them. At Rotterdam, London, Warsaw and half a hundred other places, they put their rather naive theory into operation. They sowed the wind, and now they are going to reap the whirlwind." Harris comments that he first made this comparison while standing with Portal watching the London Blitz in 1940.

At first the effects were limited because of the small numbers of aircraft used and the lack of navigational aids, resulting in scattered, inaccurate bombing. As production of better aircraft and electronic aids increased, Harris pressed for raids on a much larger scale, each to use 1,000 aeroplanes. In Operation Millennium Harris launched the first RAF "thousand bomber raid" against Cologne (Köln) on the night of 30/31 May 1942. This operation included the first use of a bomber stream, which was a tactical innovation designed to overwhelm the German night-fighters of the Kammhuber Line. Harris was promoted to temporary air marshal on 1 December 1942 and acting air chief marshal on 18 March 1943.

Harris was just one of an influential group of high-ranking Allied air commanders who continued to believe that massive and sustained area bombing alone would force Germany to surrender. On a number of occasions he wrote to his superiors claiming the war would be over in a matter of months, first in August 1943 following the tremendous success of the Battle of Hamburg (codenamed Operation Gomorrah), when he assured the Chief of the Air Staff, Sir Charles Portal, that his force would be able "to produce in Germany by April 1st 1944 a state of devastation in which surrender is inevitable" and then again in January 1944. Winston Churchill continued to regard the area bombing strategy with distaste and official public statements maintained that Bomber Command was attacking only specific industrial and economic targets, with any civilian casualties or property damage being unintentional but unavoidable. In October 1943, emboldened by his success in Hamburg and increasingly irritated with Churchill's hesitance to endorse his tactics wholeheartedly, Harris urged the government to be honest with the public regarding the purpose of the bombing campaign,

Many senior Allied air commanders still thought area bombing was less effective. In November 1943 Bomber Command began what became known as the Battle of Berlin that lasted until March 1944. Harris sought to duplicate the victory at Hamburg but Berlin proved to be a far more difficult target. Although severe general damage was inflicted, the city was much better prepared than Hamburg and no firestorms were ignited. Anti-aircraft defences were also extremely effective and bomber losses were high; the British lost 1,047 bombers, with a further 1,682 damaged, culminating in the disastrous raid on Nuremberg on 30 March 1944, when 94 bombers were shot down and 71 damaged, out of 795 aircraft. 

Harris was promoted to the substantive rank of air marshal on 1 January 1944 and awarded the Russian Order of Suvorov, First Class on 29 February 1944. After the Southern Rhodesian Prime Minister, Sir Godfrey Huggins, visited Harris in May 1944, Southern Rhodesia asked the UK government to appoint Harris as Governor at the end of the year, Huggins being keen to install a self-identifying Rhodesian in that office rather than a high-ranking British figure. Though keen to take the position, Harris felt he could not leave the war at this key stage, an opinion shared by Churchill, who turned down the Southern Rhodesian request.

Before the D-Day invasion in 1944, Harris was ordered to switch targets for the French railway network, a switch he protested against because he felt it compromised the pressure being applied to German industry and using Bomber Command for a purpose it was not designed or suited for. By September the Allied forces were well inland; at the Quebec Conference it was agreed that the Chief of the Air Staff, Royal Air Force (Portal), and the Commanding General, U.S. Army Air Forces (Arnold), should exercise control of all strategic bomber forces in Europe. Harris received a new directive to ensure continuation of a broad strategic bombing programme as well as adequate bomber support for General Eisenhower's ground operations. The mission of the strategic air forces remained "the progressive destruction and dislocation of the German military, industrial and economic systems and the direct support of Land and Naval forces".

After D-Day (6 June 1944), with the resumption of the strategic bomber campaign over Germany, Harris remained wedded to area bombardment. The historian Frederick Taylor argues that, because Harris lacked the necessary security clearance to know about Ultra, he had been given some information gleaned from Enigma but not informed of the source. According to Taylor, this directly affected Harris's attitude concerning the effectiveness of the post-D-Day 1944 directives (orders) to target oil installations, as Harris did not know the Allied High Command was using high-level German sources to assess exactly how much Allied operations were impairing the German war effort. Harris tended to see the directives to bomb specific oil and munitions targets as a high level command "panacea" (his word) and a distraction from the real task of making the rubble bounce in every large German city. Harris was promoted to the substantive rank of air chief marshal on 16 August 1944.

The historian Bernard Wasserstein notes that the official history of British strategic bombing says, in what Wasserstein describes as 'an unusually sharp personal observation', that "Harris made a habit of seeing only one side of a question and then of exaggerating it. He had a tendency to confuse advice with interference, criticism with sabotage and evidence with propaganda". Alfred C. Mierzejewski argues that area bombing and attacks against fuel plants were ineffective against Germany's coal- and rail-based economy and that the bombing campaign only took a decisive turn in late 1944, when the allies switched to attacking railway-marshalling yards for the coal gateways of the Ruhr. His summation is rejected by Sebastian Cox head of the Air Historical Branch (AHB). Cox notes that half of the oil was produced by Benzol plants located in the Ruhr. These areas were the primary target of Bomber Command in 1943 and the autumn of 1944. Cox concludes that the targets were highly vulnerable to area attacks and suffered accordingly. The American official history notes that Harris was ordered to cease attacks on oil in November 1944, as the combined bombing had been so effective that none of the synthetic plants were operating effectively. The American history also includes information from Albert Speer, in which he points out that Bomber Command's night attacks were the most effective. Harris was very encouraging of innovation but he resisted the creation of the Pathfinder Force and the development of precision strikes which had proven so effective in the Dambusters' raid.

Harris was awarded the American Legion of Merit on 30 January 1945. The most controversial raid of the war took place in the late evening of 13 February 1945. The bombing of Dresden by the RAF and USAAF resulting in a lethal firestorm which killed a large number of civilians. Estimates vary but the city authorities at the time estimated no more than 25,000 victims, a figure which subsequent investigations, including one commissioned by the city council in 2010, support. Raids such as that on Pforzheim late in the war as Germany was falling have been criticised for causing high civilian casualties for little apparent military value. The culmination of Bomber Command's offensive occurred in March 1945 when the RAF dropped the highest monthly weight of ordnance in the entire war. The last raid on Berlin took place on the night of 21/22 April, just before the Soviets entered the city centre. After that, most of the rest of the attacks made by the RAF were tactical missions. The last big strategic raid was the destruction of the oil refinery in Tønsberg in southern Norway by a large group of Lancasters on the night of 25/26 April.

In his postwar memoirs Harris wrote, "In spite of all that happened at Hamburg, bombing proved a relatively humane method". His wartime views were expressed in an internal secret memo to the Air Ministry after the Dresden raid in February 1945

Whenever the bombing campaign of World War II is considered it must be appreciated that the war was an "integrated process". As an example, quoting Albert Speer from his book Inside The Third Reich, "ten thousand [88mm] anti-aircraft guns ... could well have been employed in Russia against tanks and other ground targets". The Soviet commanders clearly recognized Harris's efforts, as shown by the 29 February 1944 award of the Russian Order of Suvorov First Class to the air marshal.

Post-war era
After the war, Harris was awarded the Polish Order of Polonia Restituta First Class on 12 June 1945, advanced to Knight Grand Cross of the Order of the Bath on 14 June 1945 and appointed a Knight Grand Cross of the Order of the Southern Cross of Brazil on 13 November 1945. He was also awarded the Distinguished Service Medal by the United States on 14 June 1946 and promoted to Marshal of the Royal Air Force on 1 January 1946.

Within the postwar British government there was some disquiet about the level of destruction that had been created by the area-bombing of German cities towards the end of the war. Harris retired on 15 September 1946 and wrote his story of Bomber Command's achievements in Bomber Offensive. In this book he wrote, concerning Dresden, "I know that the destruction of so large and splendid a city at this late stage of the war was considered unnecessary even by a good many people who admit that our earlier attacks were as fully justified as any other operation of war. Here I will only say that the attack on Dresden was at the time considered a military necessity by much more important people than myself." Bomber Command's crews were denied a separate campaign medal (despite being eligible for the Air Crew Europe Star and France and Germany Star) and, in protest at this establishment snub to his men, Harris refused a peerage in 1946; he was the sole commander-in-chief not to become a peer.

Disappointed to have missed the opportunity to return to Southern Rhodesia as governor because of the war, Harris wrote to Huggins in June 1945 that he would like to be considered if the office were ever open again, and that he would be interested in other Southern Rhodesian government appointments relating to aviation or perhaps entering politics there. "If I have deserved anything of my country—Rhodesia—it would delight me to have opportunity to serve her further," he wrote. Huggins replied that he was sympathetic, but that none of these ideas was practical: Harris would be too old by the time a new Governor was needed; it might take years for Harris to enter Southern Rhodesian politics as he would first need to meet residency requirements, then cultivate support in a constituency; and Huggins felt he could not make promises about aviation posts with a general election coming up the following year. Harris finally dropped his dream of a return to Rhodesia, deeming it unworkable, and in 1948 moved instead to South Africa, where he managed the South African Marine Corporation (Safmarine) from 1946 to 1953.

In February 1953 Winston Churchill, now prime minister again, insisted that Harris accept a baronetcy and he became baronet. In the same year he returned to the UK, and lived his remaining years in the Ferry House in Goring-on-Thames, located directly adjacent to the River Thames.

In 1974 Harris appeared in the acclaimed documentary series The World At War produced  by Thames Television and shown on ITV. In the 12th episode entitled "Whirlwind: Bombing Germany (September 1939 – April 1944)", narrated by Laurence Olivier, Harris discusses at length the area-bombing strategy that he had developed while AOC-in-C of  Bomber Command.

Family
Harris married Barbara Daisy Kyrle Money, daughter of Lieutenant Ernle William K. Money, and his wife Alexandra Gruinard Battye, in August 1916. The marriage produced three children: Anthony, Marigold and Rosemary. Harris divorced his first wife in 1935 and subsequently met Therese ('Jillie') Hearne, then twenty, through a mutual friend, and they married in 1938. Their daughter Jacqueline Jill was born in 1939; Harris is said to have "adored" her. She later married the Hon. Nicholas Assheton, CVO, Treasurer to Queen Elizabeth The Queen Mother from 1998 to her death in 2002, younger son of Ralph Assheton, 1st Baron Clitheroe.

Legacy

Harris died on 5 April 1984, eight days before his 92nd birthday, at his home in Goring. He is buried in Burntwood Cemetery at Goring.

In 1989, five years after Harris's death, a one-off feature-length drama about Harris's tenure as AOC-in-C of Bomber Command was broadcast under the title Bomber Harris on BBC Television, with John Thaw in the title role.

Despite protests from figures within Germany, with the mayor of Dresden visiting the London embassy to stake his opposition, the Bomber Harris Trust (an RAF veterans' organisation formed to defend the reputation of their former commander) erected a statue of him outside the RAF Church of St Clement Danes, London, in 1992. It was unveiled by Queen Elizabeth The Queen Mother who looked surprised when she was jeered at by protesters, one of whom shouted, "Harris was a war criminal." No member of the cabinet attended the unveiling. An inscription on the statue reads: "The Nation owes them all an immense debt." Many ex Bomber Command aircrew were present including Leonard Cheshire who was to die only two months later and attended against the advice of his doctors. He said "I would have gone even if I had to be carried on a stretcher". The statue had to be kept under 24-hour guard for a period of months as it was often damaged by protesters and vandals.

Explanatory notes

Citations

General references
 
 
 
 
 
 
 
 
 
 
 
 
 
 
 
  (Published in the United States as )

Further reading
 Bellamy, Alex J. "The ethics of terror bombing: Beyond supreme emergency". Journal of Military Ethics 7.1 (2008): 41–65. On the British decision to bomb Germany.
 
 Goulter, Christina. "Sir Arthur Harris: Different Perspectives". In Gary Sheffield, ed. The Challenges of High Command: The British Experience (Palgrave Macmillan UK, 2003) 126–136.
 
 Messenger, Charles. Bomber Harris and the Strategie Bombing Offensive: 1939-1945 (Arms and Armour Press, 1984).
 Neillands, Robin. "Facts and myths about Bomber Harris". The RUSI Journal 146.2 (2001): 69–73.
 Quast, Lou, and David Lee. "Sir Arthur 'Bomber' Harris: An effective leader in command?" (UK Dept of Defence, Geddes Papers 2004)

External links

 Biography at Spartacus Educational
 Personality Profile: Air Marshal Sir Arthur Harris
 Royal Air Force Bomber Command 60th Anniversary, Commanders
 The Destruction of Dresden – Die Zerstörung Dresdens
 Air of Authority – A History of RAF Organisation – MRAF Harris
 Imperial War Museum Interview from 1977
 Imperial War Museum Interview from 1978
 RAF Interview from 1977
 

|-

|-

|-

|-

|-

|-

|-

|-

|-

|-

1892 births
1984 deaths
Aerial warfare pioneers
Baronets in the Baronetage of the United Kingdom
British emigrants to Rhodesia
British military personnel of the 1936–1939 Arab revolt in Palestine
British World War I flying aces
Chief Commanders of the Legion of Merit
English aviators
Foreign recipients of the Distinguished Service Medal (United States)
Graduates of the Staff College, Camberley
Grand Crosses of the Order of Polonia Restituta
Grand Officiers of the Légion d'honneur
Knights Grand Cross of the Order of the Bath
Marshals of the Royal Air Force
Military personnel from Gloucestershire
Officers of the Order of the British Empire
People educated at Allhallows College
People from Cheltenham
Burials in Oxfordshire
Recipients of the Air Force Cross (United Kingdom)
Recipients of the Croix de Guerre 1939–1945 (France)
Recipients of the Distinguished Service Medal (US Army)
Recipients of the Order of Suvorov, 1st class
Rhodesia Regiment personnel
Rhodesian military personnel of World War I
Royal Air Force air marshals of World War II
Royal Flying Corps officers